All Rebel Rockers is the sixth studio album by Michael Franti & Spearhead released on September 9, 2008, on Boo Boo Wax and ANTI- Records. It peaked at number 37 on the U.S. Billboard 200, making it their most successful album.

Recorded mostly in Kingston, Jamaica, with noted producers Sly and Robbie, the album is described by Franti as having "a solid reggae feel". Guest musicians include Marie Daulne of Zap Mama and Jamaican soul/dancehall singer Cherine Anderson. All Rebel Rockers spawned the million-selling reggae/dancehall-flavoured single "Say Hey (I Love You)", which peaked at 18 on the Billboard US Hot 100.

Track listing 
 "Rude Boys Back in Town"
 "A Little Bit of Riddim"
 Featuring Cherine Anderson
 "Life in the City"
 "Hey World (Remote Control Version)"
 "All I Want Is You"
 "Say Hey (I Love You)"
 Featuring Cherine Anderson
 "I Got Love for You"
 "Soundsystem"
 Featuring Cherine Anderson
 "Hey World (Don't Give Up Version)"
 "The Future"
 "High Low"
 Featuring Zap Mama
 "Nobody Right Nobody Wrong"
 "Have a Little Faith"
 "High Low [Acoustic Mix]" (Bonus Track)
 "Rude Boys Back in Town [News Flash Mix]" (Bonus Track)
 "Into the Sun [Dub Version]" (Bonus Track, only on vinyl and iTunes)

Personnel 
 Cherine Anderson – vocals
 Marie Daulne – vocals
 Sly Dunbar – production
 Michael Franti – vocals
 Manas Itene – drums
 Raleigh Neal II – keyboards
 Robbie Shakespeare – production
 Dave Shul – guitars
 Carl Young – bass

Charts

References 

2008 albums
Anti- (record label) albums
Michael Franti albums